Dai Takegami Podziewski (born 31 August 2001) a footballer who plays for MP United. Born in Japan, he represents the Northern Mariana Islands national team.

Podziewski has committed to play collegiate association football for Suffolk University.

Career statistics

International

References

2001 births
Living people
People from Tondabayashi, Osaka
Association football people from Osaka Prefecture
Association football defenders
Northern Mariana Islands footballers
Northern Mariana Islands international footballers
Sportspeople from Osaka Prefecture